Abigail Clayton is an American retired pornographic actress active during the Golden Age of Porn. She was inducted into the XRCO Hall of Fame in 2008.

Film career 
Clayton started her career in 1976 during the porn chic era when adult movies were shown in mainstream theaters. She started ouf first posing for magazines such as Hustler and Swank before making the jump to adult films. Her name would often appear in ads in major newspapers of the time, alongside other stars such as Annette Haven and Leslie Bovee.

One of Clayton's earliest movies was Alex de Renzy's Femmes de Sade, which was the eighth film inducted into XRCO's Hall of Fame. Clayton also appeared in Harold Lime's Desires Within Young Girls with Georgina Spelvin and was the title character in Antonio Shepherd's 7 Into Snowy a parody of Snow White and the Seven Dwarfs. Her last adult film was October Silk in 1980.

Personal life 

The daughter of a successful doctor on the East Coast Clayton worked as a film editor at Parker Labs in San Francisco. She dated actor Ken Scudder who she met filming a porn loop. Clayton later married a male nurse who was a junkie but then divorced. She had a daughter.

Mainstream films 
Abigail Clayton was one of the first adult stars to move into mainstream films when she appeared in Bye Bye Monkey with Gérard Depardieu and Marcello Mastroianni. In 1980, she was cast as Rita in the horror film Maniac. Her last mainstream role was a small part as a nun in the Ryan O'Neal film So Fine in 1981.

Partial filmography 
Clayton only appeared in 16 original adult films during her career, far fewer than most other adult stars. She appeared in another 22 films that were compilations of scenes from her previous movies.

Adult films 
The Girls in the Band (1976)
Dixie (1976)
Love Lips (1978)
Femmes de Sade (1976)
Spirit Of Seventy Sex (1976)
Naked Afternoon (1976)
Hot Cookies (1977)
Desires Within Young Girls (1977)
A Coming of Angels (1977)
7 Into Snowy (1977)
Sex World (1977)
Untamed (1978)
Health Spa (1978)
Cave Women (1979)
October Silk (1980)
Sweet Girl (1980)

Mainstream films 
Bye Bye Monkey (1978)
Maniac (1980)
So Fine (1981)

Awards
XRCO Hall of Fame

See also
 List of pornographic actors who appeared in mainstream films

References

External links 
 
 
 

Actresses from New York City
American pornographic film actresses
Living people
Pornographic film actors from New York (state)
20th-century American actresses
21st-century American women
1960 births